The Braille pattern dots-36 is a 6-dot braille cell with both bottom dots raised, or an 8-dot braille cell with both lower-middle dots raised. It is represented by the Unicode code point U+2824, and in Braille ASCII with the hyphen: -.

Unified Braille

In unified international braille, the braille pattern dots-36 is used to represent hyphens and dashes, and otherwise as needed.

Table of unified braille values

† Abolished in Unified English Braille

Other braille

Plus dots 7 and 8

Related to Braille pattern dots-36 are Braille patterns 367, 368, and 3678, which are used in 8-dot braille systems, such as Gardner-Salinas and Luxembourgish Braille.

Related 8-dot kantenji patterns

In the Japanese kantenji braille, the standard 8-dot Braille patterns 78, 178, 478, and 1478 are the patterns related to Braille pattern dots-36, since the two additional dots of kantenji patterns 036, 367, and 0367 are placed above the base 6-dot cell, instead of below, as in standard 8-dot braille.

Kantenji using braille patterns 78, 178, 478, or 1478

This listing includes kantenji using Braille pattern dots-36 for all 6349 kanji found in JIS C 6226-1978.

  - 学

Variants and thematic compounds

  -  selector 1 + 龸  =  亠
  -  selector 4 + 龸  =  凡
  -  selector 5 + 龸  =  舜
  -  selector 6 + 龸  =  几
  -  龸 + selector 1  =  愛
  -  龸 + selector 2  =  光
  -  龸 + selector 3  =  文
  -  比 + 龸  =  下
  -  selector 1 + 比 + 龸  =  卞

Compounds of 学 and 龸

  -  龸 + 龸 + こ/子  =  學
  -  ふ/女 + 龸  =  妥
  -  い/糹/#2 + ふ/女 + 龸  =  綏
  -  せ/食 + ふ/女 + 龸  =  餒
  -  龸 + ゑ/訁  =  受
  -  て/扌 + 龸  =  授
  -  ゐ/幺 + 龸 + ゑ/訁  =  綬
  -  け/犬 + 龸  =  獣
  -  け/犬 + け/犬 + 龸  =  獸
  -  龸 + 宿  =  党
  -  龸 + 龸 + 宿  =  黨
  -  な/亻 + 龸 + 宿  =  儻
  -  龸 + ぬ/力  =  労
  -  龸 + 龸 + ぬ/力  =  勞
  -  て/扌 + 龸 + ぬ/力  =  撈
  -  や/疒 + 龸 + ぬ/力  =  癆
  -  龸 + み/耳  =  営
  -  龸 + 龸 + み/耳  =  營
  -  龸 + つ/土  =  堂
  -  め/目 + 龸 + つ/土  =  瞠
  -  む/車 + 龸 + つ/土  =  螳
  -  龸 + し/巿  =  常
  -  ふ/女 + 龸 + し/巿  =  嫦
  -  む/車 + 龸 + し/巿  =  蟐
  -  龸 + ふ/女  =  当
  -  龸 + 龸 + ふ/女  =  當
  -  ね/示 + 龸 + ふ/女  =  襠
  -  む/車 + 龸 + ふ/女  =  蟷
  -  ま/石 + 龸 + ふ/女  =  礑
  -  き/木 + 龸 + ふ/女  =  档
  -  龸 + て/扌  =  掌
  -  龸 + き/木  =  栄
  -  龸 + 龸 + き/木  =  榮
  -  む/車 + 龸 + き/木  =  蠑
  -  龸 + や/疒  =  爵
  -  れ/口 + 龸 + や/疒  =  嚼
  -  龸 + め/目  =  覚
  -  て/扌 + 龸 + め/目  =  撹
  -  龸 + 龸 + め/目  =  覺
  -  龸 + え/訁  =  誉
  -  龸 + 龸 + え/訁  =  譽
  -  龸 + を/貝  =  賞
  -  ゆ/彳 + 龸 + か/金  =  徭
  -  る/忄 + 龸 + け/犬  =  懽
  -  氷/氵 + 龸 + け/犬  =  灌
  -  え/訁 + 龸 + け/犬  =  讙
  -  か/金 + 龸 + け/犬  =  鑵
  -  ほ/方 + 龸 + う/宀/#3  =  殍
  -  火 + 龸 + ろ/十  =  煢
  -  く/艹 + 龸 + け/犬  =  蕚
  -  け/犬 + 龸 + せ/食  =  鶚
  -  龸 + 宿 + に/氵  =  嘗
  -  龸 + selector 4 + る/忄  =  甞
  -  の/禾 + の/禾 + 龸  =  稱
  -  龸 + め/目 + 宿  =  覓
  -  龸 + せ/食 + selector 1  =  鷽
  -  龸 + し/巿 + こ/子  =  黌

Compounds of 亠

  -  れ/口 + 龸  =  囃
  -  龸 + ち/竹  =  交
  -  な/亻 + 龸 + ち/竹  =  佼
  -  れ/口 + 龸 + ち/竹  =  咬
  -  け/犬 + 龸 + ち/竹  =  狡
  -  日 + 龸 + ち/竹  =  皎
  -  い/糹/#2 + 龸 + ち/竹  =  纐
  -  む/車 + 龸 + ち/竹  =  蛟
  -  そ/馬 + 龸 + ち/竹  =  駮
  -  せ/食 + 龸 + ち/竹  =  鮫
  -  龸 + ま/石  =  亨
  -  火 + 龸 + ま/石  =  烹
  -  龸 + こ/子  =  享
  -  る/忄 + 龸 + こ/子  =  惇
  -  き/木 + 龸 + こ/子  =  椁
  -  え/訁 + 龸 + こ/子  =  諄
  -  せ/食 + 龸 + こ/子  =  醇
  -  龸 + れ/口  =  京
  -  ぬ/力 + 龸 + れ/口  =  勍
  -  て/扌 + 龸 + れ/口  =  掠
  -  心 + 龸 + れ/口  =  椋
  -  か/金 + 龸 + れ/口  =  鍄
  -  し/巿 + 龸 + れ/口  =  黥
  -  龸 + ね/示  =  哀
  -  龸 + 囗  =  壇
  -  心 + 龸 + 囗  =  檀
  -  そ/馬 + 龸 + 囗  =  羶
  -  龸 + な/亻  =  夜
  -  て/扌 + 龸 + な/亻  =  掖
  -  ⺼ + 龸 + な/亻  =  腋
  -  龸 + せ/食  =  毫
  -  龸 + そ/馬  =  豪
  -  つ/土 + 龸 + そ/馬  =  壕
  -  に/氵 + 龸 + そ/馬  =  濠
  -  龸 + ゐ/幺  =  玄
  -  ゆ/彳 + 龸  =  弦
  -  龸 + た/⽥  =  畜
  -  龸 + ろ/十  =  率
  -  む/車 + 龸 + ろ/十  =  蟀
  -  や/疒 + 龸 + ゐ/幺  =  痃
  -  め/目 + 龸 + ゐ/幺  =  眩
  -  い/糹/#2 + 龸 + ゐ/幺  =  絃
  -  ふ/女 + 龸 + ゐ/幺  =  舷
  -  ゆ/彳 + 龸 + ゐ/幺  =  衒
  -  か/金 + 龸 + ゐ/幺  =  鉉
  -  せ/食 + 龸 + ゐ/幺  =  鯀
  -  龸 + よ/广  =  棄
  -  龸 + 龸 + よ/广  =  弃
  -  龸 + ら/月  =  育
  -  selector 1 + 龸 + れ/口  =  亰
  -  龸 + 日  =  冥
  -  し/巿 + 龸 + 日  =  幎
  -  日 + 龸 + 日  =  暝
  -  心 + 龸 + 日  =  榠
  -  に/氵 + 龸 + 日  =  溟
  -  め/目 + 龸 + 日  =  瞑
  -  む/車 + 龸 + 日  =  螟
  -  日 + 龸 + ろ/十  =  暸
  -  に/氵 + 龸 + ろ/十  =  潦
  -  き/木 + 龸 + ま/石  =  柆
  -  ま/石 + 龸 + 氷/氵  =  竭
  -  き/木 + 龸 + け/犬  =  桍
  -  も/門 + 龸 + し/巿  =  閙
  -  龸 + う/宀/#3 + な/亻  =  亳
  -  龸 + selector 4 + く/艹  =  毓
  -  に/氵 + 宿 + 龸  =  滾
  -  龸 + ね/示 + selector 1  =  褻
  -  龸 + な/亻 + れ/口  =  襃
  -  せ/食 + 氷/氵 + 龸  =  酖
  -  龸 + 宿 + せ/食  =  鶉

Compounds of 凡

  -  し/巿 + 龸  =  帆
  -  ち/竹 + 龸  =  築
  -  龸 + 心  =  恐
  -  き/木 + selector 4 + 龸  =  梵
  -  に/氵 + selector 4 + 龸  =  汎
  -  む/車 + 龸 + 龸  =  蛩
  -  む/車 + 龸 + 龸  =  蛩
  -  み/耳 + 宿 + 龸  =  跫
  -  龸 + と/戸 + ろ/十  =  鞏

Compounds of 舜

  -  め/目 + 龸  =  瞬
  -  心 + selector 5 + 龸  =  蕣

Compounds of 几

  -  龸 + 龸  =  充
  -  い/糹/#2 + 龸  =  統
  -  か/金 + 龸  =  銃
  -  つ/土 + 龸  =  先
  -  に/氵 + 龸  =  洗
  -  ち/竹 + つ/土 + 龸  =  筅
  -  み/耳 + つ/土 + 龸  =  跣
  -  宿 + 龸  =  冗
  -  る/忄 + 宿 + 龸  =  忱
  -  め/目 + 宿 + 龸  =  眈
  -  す/発 + 龸  =  処
  -  す/発 + す/発 + 龸  =  處
  -  や/疒 + 龸  =  凱
  -  も/門 + 龸  =  匹
  -  き/木 + 龸  =  机
  -  み/耳 + 龸  =  耽
  -  氷/氵 + 龸  =  沈
  -  龸 + 仁/亻  =  就
  -  ⺼ + 龸  =  肌
  -  お/頁 + 龸  =  頽
  -  せ/食 + 龸  =  飢
  -  れ/口 + selector 6 + 龸  =  咒
  -  仁/亻 + 龸 + 龸  =  凭
  -  く/艹 + 龸 + の/禾  =  芟
  -  む/車 + 龸 + の/禾  =  轂
  -  む/車 + 宿 + 龸  =  允
  -  仁/亻 + 龸 + 龸  =  凭
  -  て/扌 + 宿 + 龸  =  撓
  -  き/木 + 宿 + 龸  =  橈
  -  の/禾 + 宿 + 龸  =  禿
  -  龸 + う/宀/#3 + せ/食  =  鳧

Compounds of 愛

  -  日 + 龸 + selector 1  =  曖
  -  め/目 + 龸 + selector 1  =  瞹
  -  ち/竹 + 龸 + selector 1  =  靉

Compounds of 光

  -  龸 + む/車  =  輝
  -  る/忄 + 龸 + selector 2  =  恍
  -  日 + 龸 + selector 2  =  晃
  -  氷/氵 + 龸 + selector 2  =  滉
  -  に/氵 + 龸 + selector 2  =  洸
  -  い/糹/#2 + 龸 + selector 2  =  絖
  -  ⺼ + 龸 + selector 2  =  胱
  -  日 + 宿 + 龸  =  晄
  -  龸 + 宿 + や/疒  =  耀

Compounds of 文

  -  さ/阝 + 龸  =  斉
  -  い/糹/#2 + さ/阝 + 龸  =  緕
  -  さ/阝 + さ/阝 + 龸  =  齊
  -  さ/阝 + 龸 + 火  =  韲
  -  な/亻 + さ/阝 + 龸  =  儕
  -  て/扌 + さ/阝 + 龸  =  擠
  -  心 + さ/阝 + 龸  =  薺
  -  み/耳 + さ/阝 + 龸  =  躋
  -  ち/竹 + さ/阝 + 龸  =  霽
  -  火 + 龸  =  斐
  -  へ/⺩ + 龸  =  斑
  -  ゐ/幺 + 龸  =  紋
  -  む/車 + 龸  =  蚊
  -  龸 + さ/阝  =  斎
  -  龸 + 龸 + さ/阝  =  齋
  -  を/貝 + 龸 + さ/阝  =  齎
  -  れ/口 + 龸 + selector 3  =  吝
  -  る/忄 + 龸  =  悋
  -  こ/子 + 龸 + selector 3  =  斈
  -  日 + 龸 + selector 3  =  旻
  -  い/糹/#2 + 龸 + selector 3  =  紊
  -  す/発 + 龸 + selector 3  =  虔
  -  も/門 + 龸 + selector 3  =  閔
  -  そ/馬 + 龸 + selector 3  =  馼

Compounds of 下 and 卞

  -  つ/土 + 比 + 龸  =  圷
  -  き/木 + 比 + 龸  =  梺
  -  も/門 + 比 + 龸  =  閇
  -  ち/竹 + 比 + 龸  =  雫
  -  て/扌 + 比 + 龸  =  抃
  -  ね/示 + う/宀/#3 + 龸  =  裃
  -  と/戸 + う/宀/#3 + 龸  =  鞐
  -  龸 + む/車 + 宿  =  颪

Other compounds

  -  ほ/方 + 龸  =  於
  -  れ/口 + ほ/方 + 龸  =  唹
  -  に/氵 + ほ/方 + 龸  =  淤
  -  も/門 + ほ/方 + 龸  =  閼
  -  せ/食 + ほ/方 + 龸  =  鯲
  -  囗 + 龸  =  図
  -  囗 + 囗 + 龸  =  圖
  -  日 + 龸  =  晶
  -  き/木 + 日 + 龸  =  橸
  -  ね/示 + 龸  =  祢
  -  ね/示 + ね/示 + 龸  =  袮
  -  の/禾 + 龸  =  称
  -  心 + 龸  =  蕨
  -  ひ/辶 + 龸  =  迄
  -  と/戸 + 龸  =  鬢
  -  龸 + お/頁  =  乞
  -  龸 + ほ/方  =  夢
  -  な/亻 + 龸 + ほ/方  =  儚
  -  龸 + ひ/辶  =  戉
  -  か/金 + 龸 + ひ/辶  =  鉞
  -  龸 + は/辶  =  毎
  -  龸 + 氷/氵  =  敏
  -  心 + 龸 + は/辶  =  莓
  -  龸 + 火  =  為
  -  龸 + 龸 + 火  =  爲
  -  え/訁 + 龸 + 火  =  譌
  -  龸 + り/分  =  重
  -  ⺼ + 龸 + り/分  =  腫
  -  く/艹 + 龸 + り/分  =  董
  -  み/耳 + 龸 + り/分  =  踵
  -  か/金 + 龸 + り/分  =  鍾
  -  龸 + い/糹/#2  =  雑
  -  龸 + 龸 + い/糹/#2  =  雜
  -  な/亻 + 龸 + け/犬  =  倏
  -  れ/口 + 龸 + お/頁  =  吃
  -  え/訁 + 龸 + お/頁  =  訖
  -  な/亻 + 龸 + も/門  =  偃
  -  れ/口 + 龸 + そ/馬  =  喙
  -  と/戸 + 龸 + の/禾  =  彝
  -  囗 + 龸 + ほ/方  =  圀
  -  つ/土 + 龸 + と/戸  =  垪
  -  つ/土 + 龸 + selector 1  =  壺
  -  ふ/女 + 龸 + ゑ/訁  =  娵
  -  こ/子 + 龸 + 氷/氵  =  孜
  -  や/疒 + 龸 + お/頁  =  屹
  -  や/疒 + 龸 + つ/土  =  崕
  -  や/疒 + 龸 + る/忄  =  崘
  -  よ/广 + 龸 + き/木  =  廝
  -  る/忄 + 龸 + む/車  =  慚
  -  お/頁 + 龸 + 囗  =  戞
  -  て/扌 + 龸 + む/車  =  搆
  -  て/扌 + 龸 + う/宀/#3  =  搴
  -  日 + 龸 + む/車  =  暉
  -  き/木 + 龸 + 囗  =  杙
  -  心 + 龸 + 数  =  杤
  -  き/木 + 龸 + 日  =  杳
  -  心 + 龸 + ひ/辶  =  杷
  -  心 + 龸 + 比  =  枇
  -  心 + 龸 + り/分  =  枌
  -  き/木 + 龸 + と/戸  =  枦
  -  き/木 + 龸 + ぬ/力  =  枴
  -  き/木 + 龸 + を/貝  =  柝
  -  心 + 龸 + む/車  =  栩
  -  き/木 + 龸 + や/疒  =  梍
  -  き/木 + 龸 + き/木  =  棊
  -  心 + 龸 + ゆ/彳  =  棣
  -  心 + 龸 + も/門  =  椚
  -  き/木 + 龸 + そ/馬  =  椽
  -  き/木 + 龸 + む/車  =  樛
  -  き/木 + 龸 + 龸  =  橇
  -  心 + 龸 + ま/石  =  檗
  -  き/木 + 龸 + へ/⺩  =  檮
  -  心 + 龸 + た/⽥  =  櫨
  -  に/氵 + 龸 + ん/止  =  沚
  -  に/氵 + 龸 + む/車  =  浚
  -  に/氵 + 龸 + つ/土  =  涌
  -  に/氵 + 龸 + ら/月  =  涓
  -  に/氵 + 龸 + ぬ/力  =  渕
  -  に/氵 + 龸 + ⺼  =  渙
  -  に/氵 + 龸 + ゆ/彳  =  渝
  -  氷/氵 + 龸 + そ/馬  =  漾
  -  に/氵 + 龸 + め/目  =  濬
  -  に/氵 + 龸 + か/金  =  瀏
  -  に/氵 + 龸 + た/⽥  =  瀘
  -  め/目 + 龸 + ち/竹  =  爻
  -  そ/馬 + 龸 + そ/馬  =  犧
  -  ゆ/彳 + 龸 + た/⽥  =  疆
  -  ま/石 + 龸 + そ/馬  =  碼
  -  ま/石 + 龸 + つ/土  =  磽
  -  ま/石 + 龸 + ま/石  =  礪
  -  ね/示 + 龸 + さ/阝  =  祁
  -  ね/示 + 龸 + た/⽥  =  禝
  -  ち/竹 + 龸 + そ/馬  =  筝
  -  ち/竹 + 龸 + へ/⺩  =  筺
  -  ち/竹 + 龸 + 囗  =  箘
  -  ち/竹 + 龸 + 比  =  篦
  -  ち/竹 + 龸 + ね/示  =  簔
  -  ち/竹 + 龸 + 日  =  簷
  -  ち/竹 + 龸 + ら/月  =  籀
  -  ち/竹 + 龸 + み/耳  =  籖
  -  の/禾 + 龸 + と/戸  =  粐
  -  い/糹/#2 + 龸 + 囗  =  綫
  -  い/糹/#2 + 龸 + み/耳  =  纎
  -  そ/馬 + 龸 + 火  =  羹
  -  み/耳 + 龸 + ゐ/幺  =  聨
  -  心 + 龸 + め/目  =  苜
  -  心 + 龸 + き/木  =  菫
  -  心 + 龸 + と/戸  =  萄
  -  心 + 龸 + ほ/方  =  葡
  -  そ/馬 + 龸 + ら/月  =  葢
  -  心 + 龸 + の/禾  =  葭
  -  心 + 龸 + す/発  =  蔆
  -  心 + 龸 + 火  =  薤
  -  く/艹 + 龸 + 数  =  藪
  -  心 + 龸 + そ/馬  =  蘓
  -  く/艹 + 龸 + ま/石  =  蘰
  -  む/車 + 龸 + 宿  =  蛻
  -  む/車 + 龸 + へ/⺩  =  蝗
  -  む/車 + 龸 + 囗  =  蠏
  -  む/車 + 龸 + く/艹  =  蠖
  -  む/車 + 龸 + ま/石  =  蠹
  -  え/訁 + 龸 + ま/石  =  謾
  -  え/訁 + 龸 + 日  =  譖
  -  え/訁 + 龸 + つ/土  =  讌
  -  そ/馬 + 龸 + 比  =  貔
  -  み/耳 + 龸 + ん/止  =  趾
  -  み/耳 + 龸 + も/門  =  躪
  -  み/耳 + 龸 + よ/广  =  軅
  -  む/車 + 龸 + う/宀/#3  =  軫
  -  む/車 + 龸 + と/戸  =  辯
  -  ひ/辶 + 龸 + む/車  =  逵
  -  せ/食 + 龸 + の/禾  =  酥
  -  せ/食 + 龸 + た/⽥  =  醴
  -  か/金 + 龸 + ぬ/力  =  釛
  -  か/金 + 龸 + た/⽥  =  鈿
  -  か/金 + 龸 + ま/石  =  鉐
  -  か/金 + 龸 + ゆ/彳  =  銜
  -  か/金 + 龸 + の/禾  =  鍜
  -  か/金 + 龸 + る/忄  =  鐶
  -  か/金 + 龸 + ろ/十  =  鑞
  -  さ/阝 + 龸 + な/亻  =  陝
  -  お/頁 + 龸 + け/犬  =  頸
  -  せ/食 + 龸 + け/犬  =  飫
  -  せ/食 + 龸 + ほ/方  =  餔
  -  せ/食 + 龸 + ら/月  =  餾
  -  せ/食 + 龸 + ま/石  =  饅
  -  そ/馬 + 龸 + と/戸  =  駢
  -  せ/食 + 龸 + つ/土  =  鯒
  -  せ/食 + 龸 + す/発  =  鰒
  -  せ/食 + 龸 + ⺼  =  鰛
  -  な/亻 + 龸 + せ/食  =  鳰
  -  ろ/十 + 龸 + せ/食  =  鴇
  -  よ/广 + 龸 + せ/食  =  鴈
  -  ひ/辶 + 龸 + せ/食  =  鴕
  -  れ/口 + 龸 + せ/食  =  鴣
  -  む/車 + 龸 + せ/食  =  鴾
  -  り/分 + 龸 + せ/食  =  鴿
  -  ゆ/彳 + 龸 + せ/食  =  鵄
  -  み/耳 + 龸 + せ/食  =  鵈
  -  を/貝 + 龸 + せ/食  =  鵙
  -  囗 + 龸 + せ/食  =  鵡
  -  龸 + 龸 + せ/食  =  鵺
  -  か/金 + 龸 + せ/食  =  鷂
  -  め/目 + 龸 + せ/食  =  鷏
  -  と/戸 + 龸 + せ/食  =  鷓
  -  つ/土 + 龸 + せ/食  =  鷙
  -  宿 + 宿 + 龸  =  亅
  -  数 + う/宀/#3 + 龸  =  卍
  -  ゆ/彳 + 宿 + 龸  =  弥
  -  龸 + 囗 + ん/止  =  斌
  -  き/木 + 龸 + 龸  =  橇
  -  へ/⺩ + 宿 + 龸  =  珎
  -  龸 + selector 4 + 火  =  韭

Notes

Braille patterns